The 2021 Milwaukee Brewers season was the 52nd season for the Brewers in Milwaukee, the 24th in the National League, and 53rd overall.

On July 9, 2020, MLB announced the 2021 season schedule.

On September 18, the Brewers clinched a playoff berth, extending their consecutive postseason streak to four years, a franchise record.

On September 26, the Brewers clinched the National League Central division for the first time since the 2018 season. They lost to the Atlanta Braves in the 2021 National League Division Series.

Spring training
The Brewers finished spring training with a record of 15–11 (3 ties).

Opening Day Starters

Season standings

National League Central

National League Wild Card

Record vs. opponents

Roster

Game log

Regular season

|-style=background:#cfc
| 1 || April 1 || Twins || 6–5 (10) || Hader (1–0) || Dobnak (0–1) || — || 11,740 || 1–0 || W1
|-style=background:#fbb
| 2 || April 3 || Twins || 0–2 || Berríos (1–0) || Burnes (0–1) || Colomé (1) || 11,383 || 1–1 || L1
|-style=background:#fbb
| 3 || April 4 || Twins || 2–8 || Pineda (1–0) || Houser (0–1) || — || 10,666 || 1–2 || L2
|-style=background:#fbb
| 4 || April 5 || @ Cubs || 3–5 || Williams (1–0) || Anderson (0–1) || Mills (1) || 10,343 || 1–3 || L3
|-style=background:#cfc
| 5 || April 6 || @ Cubs || 4–0 || Peralta (1–0) || Alzolay (0–1) ||  || 10,343 || 2–3 || W1
|-style=background:#cfc
| 6 || April 7 || @ Cubs || 4–2 (10) || Hader (2–0) || Workman (0–1) || Boxberger (1) || 10,343 || 3–3 || W2
|-style=background:#fbb
| 7 || April 8 || @ Cardinals || 1–3 || Gallegos (2–0) || Rasmussen (0–1) || Reyes (3) || 13,328 || 3–4 || L1
|-style=background:#cfc
| 8 || April 10 || @ Cardinals || 9–5 || Houser (1–1) || Martínez (0–2) || — || 13,304 || 4–4 || W1
|-style=background:#cfc
| 9 || April 11 || @ Cardinals || 9–3 || Anderson (1–1) || Ponce de Leon (1–1) || — || 13,176 || 5–4 || W2
|-style=background:#cfc
| 10 || April 12 || Cubs || 6–3 || Peralta (2–0) || Alzolay (0–2) || Hader (1) || 11,209 || 6–4 || W3
|-style=background:#fbb
| 11 || April 13 || Cubs || 2–3 || Strop (1–0) || Suter (0–1) || Kimbrel (3) || 11,025 || 6–5 || L1
|-style=background:#cfc
| 12 || April 14 || Cubs || 7–0 || Burnes (1–1) || Arrieta (2–1) || — || 10,598 || 7–5 || W1
|-style=background:#fbb
| 13 || April 16 || Pirates || 1–6 || Brubaker (2–0) || Houser (1–2) || — || 11,967 || 7–6 || L1
|-style=background:#cfc
| 14 || April 17 || Pirates || 7–1 || Anderson (2–1) || Cahill (0–2) || — || 12,038 || 8–6 || W1
|-style=background:#fbb
| 15 || April 18 || Pirates || 5–6  || Rodríguez (1–0) || Feyereisen (0–1) || — || 11,772 || 8–7 || L1
|-style=background:#cfc
| 16 || April 19 || @ Padres || 3–1 || Woodruff (1–0) || Musgrove (2–2) || Hader (2) || 15,250 || 9–7 || W1
|-style=background:#cfc
| 17 || April 20 || @ Padres || 6–0 || Burnes (2–1) || Paddack (1–2) || — || 15,250 || 10–7 || W2
|-style=background:#cfc
| 18 || April 21 || @ Padres || 4–2 || Suter (1–1) || Kela (2–1) || Hader (3) || 15,250 || 11–7 || W3
|-style=background:#fbb
| 19 || April 23 || @ Cubs || 2–15 || Hendricks (1–2) || Anderson (2–2) || — || 10,343 || 11–8 || L1
|-style=background:#cfc
| 20 || April 24 || @ Cubs || 4–3 || Suter (2–1) || Chafin (0–1) || Hader (4) || 10,343 || 12–8 || W1
|-style=background:#cfc
| 21 || April 25 || @ Cubs || 6–0 || Woodruff (2–0) || Arrieta (3–2) || — || 10,343 || 13–8 || W2
|-style=background:#fbb
| 22 || April 26 || Marlins || 0–8 || Rogers (3–1) || Burnes (2–2) || — || 10,749 || 13–9 || L1
|-style=background:#cfc
| 23 || April 27 || Marlins || 5–4 || Houser (2–2) || Curtiss (2–1) || Hader (5) || 10,620 || 14–9 || W1
|-style=background:#fbb
| 24 || April 28 || Marlins || 2–6 || Alcántara (1–2) || Godley (0–1) || — || 11,564 || 14–10 || L1
|-style=background:#cfc
| 25 || April 29 || Dodgers || 2–1 || Lauer (1–0) || Bauer (3–1) || Hader (6) || 10,621 || 15–10 || W1
|-style=background:#cfc
| 26 || April 30 || Dodgers || 3–1 || Peralta (3–0) || Uceta (0–1) || Hader (7) || 12,044 || 16–10 || W2
|-

|-style=background:#cfc
| 27 || May 1 || Dodgers || 6–5 (11) || Perdomo (1–0) || Vesia (0–1) || — || 12,139 || 17–10 || W3
|-style=background:#fbb
| 28 || May 2 || Dodgers || 4–16 || Urías (4–0) || Bettinger (0–1) || — || 12,130 || 17–11 || L1
|-style=background:#fbb
| 29 || May 3 || @ Phillies || 3–4 || Velasquez (1–0) || Houser (2–3) || Neris (6) || 10,651 || 17–12 || L2
|-style=background:#fbb
| 30 || May 4 || @ Phillies || 5–6 || Nola (3–1) || Lauer (1–1) || Coonrod (2) || 10,388 || 17–13 || L3
|-style=background:#fbb
| 31 || May 5 || @ Phillies || 4–5 || Kintzler (2–1) || Peralta (3–1) || Alvarado (2) || 10,110 || 17–14 || L4
|-style=background:#fbb
| 32 || May 6 || @ Phillies || 0–2 || Wheeler (3–2) || Woodruff (2–1) || — || 10,768 || 17–15 || L5
|-style=background:#fbb
| 33 || May 7 || @ Marlins || 1–6 || Rogers (4–2) || Suter (2–2) || — || 5,507 || 17–16 || L6
|-style=background:#cfc
| 34 || May 8 || @ Marlins || 6–2 || Houser (3–3) || Castano (0–2) || — || 5,764 || 18–16 || W1
|-style=background:#cfc
| 35 || May 9 || @ Marlins || 2–1 (10) || Hader (3–0) || Bass (1–3) || Rasmussen (1) || 5,105 || 19–16 || W2
|-style=background:#fbb
| 36 || May 11 || Cardinals || 1–6 (11) || Reyes (2–0) || Boxberger (0–1) || — || 10,595 || 19–17 || L1
|-style=background:#cfc
| 37 || May 12 || Cardinals || 4–1 || Williams (1–0) || Helsley (3–1) || Hader (8) || 10,226 || 20–17 || W1
|-style=background:#fbb
| 38 || May 13 || Cardinals || 0–2 || Flaherty (7–0) || Burnes (2–3) || Reyes (11) || 10,554 || 20–18 || L1
|-style=background:#fbb
| 39 || May 14 || Braves || 3–6 || Smyly (2–2) || Houser (3–4) || — || 12,130 || 20–19 || L2
|-style=background:#fbb
| 40 || May 15 || Braves || 1–5 || Anderson (3–1) || Anderson (2–3) || — || 16,344 || 20–20 || L3
|-style=background:#cfc
| 41 || May 16 || Braves || 10–9 || Peralta (4–1) || Ynoa (4–2) || Hader (9) || 16,044 || 21–20 || W1
|-style=background:#fbb
| 42 || May 18 || @ Royals || 0–2 || Brentz (1–0) || Woodruff (2–2) || Staumont (4) || 9,298 || 21–21 || L1
|-style=background:#fbb
| 43 || May 19 || @ Royals || 4–6 || Barlow (2–1) || Feyereisen (0–2) || Staumont (5) || 8,950 || 21–22 || L2
|-style=background:#fbb
| 44 || May 21 || @ Reds || 4–9 || Hoffman (3–3) || Houser (3–5) || — || 17,234 || 21–23 || L3
|-style=background:#cfc
| 45 || May 22 || @ Reds || 4–3 || Suter (3–2) || Hembree (0–1) || Hader (10) || 17,611 || 22–23 || W1
|-style=background:#cfc
| 46 || May 23 || @ Reds || 9–4 || Boxberger (1–1) || Castillo (1–7) || — || 16,171 || 23–23 || W2
|-style=background:#cfc
| 47 || May 24 || Padres || 5–3 || Woodruff (3–2) || Snell (1–1) || Hader (11) || 14,524 || 24–23 || W3
|-style=background:#fbb
| 48 || May 25 || Padres || 1–7 || Hill (3–2) || Burnes (2–4) || — || 13,566 || 24–24 || L1
|-style=background:#fbb
| 49 || May 26 || Padres || 1–2 (10) || Adams (1–0) || Suter (3–3) || Melancon (17) || 13,478 || 24–25 || L2
|-style=background:#cfc
| 50 || May 27 || Padres || 6–5 (10) || Suter (4–3) || Díaz (2–1) || — || 13,572 || 25–25 || W1
|-style="background:#bbb
| — || May 28 || @ Nationals || colspan=7 | Postponed (rain; makeup May 29)
|-style=background:#cfc
| 51 || May 29  || @ Nationals || 4–1 (7) || Peralta (5–1) || Corbin (3–4) || — || 9,910 || 26–25 || W2
|-style=background:#cfc
| 52 || May 29  || @ Nationals || 6–2 (7) || Suter (5–3) || Hudson (3–1) || — || 12,529 || 27–25 || W3
|-style=background:#cfc
| 53 || May 30 || @ Nationals || 3–0 || Woodruff (4–2) || Scherzer (4–4) || Hader (12) || 15,326 || 28–25 || W4
|-style=background:#cfc
| 54 || May 31 || Tigers ||  3–2 (10) || Boxberger (2–1) || Cisnero (0–2) || — || 23,917 || 29–25 || W5
|-

|-style=background:#fbb
| 55 || June 1 || Tigers || 7–10 || Holland (1–1) || Lauer (1–2) || — || 12,058 || 29–26 || L1
|-style=background:#cfc
| 56 || June 3 || Diamondbacks || 7–4 || Suter (6–3) || Duplantier (0–1) || Hader (13) || 12,392 || 30–26 || W1
|-style=background:#cfc
| 57 || June 4 || Diamondbacks || 5–1 || Peralta (6–1) || Peacock (2–2) || — || 15,261 || 31–26 || W2
|-style=background:#cfc
| 58 || June 5 || Diamondbacks || 7–5 || Williams (2–0) || Soria (0–2) || Hader (14) || 20,073 || 32–26 || W3
|-style=background:#cfc
| 59 || June 6 || Diamondbacks || 2–0 || Burnes (3–4) || Smith (2–2) || Boxberger (2) || 20,117 || 33–26 || W4
|-style=background:#cfc
| 60 || June 8 || @ Reds || 5–1 || Houser (4–5) || Hendrix (2–1) || — || 11,897 || 34–26 || W5
|-style=background:#fbb
| 61 || June 9 || @ Reds || 3–7 || Gutiérrez (2–1) || Anderson (2–4) || — || 11,862 || 34–27 || L1
|-style=background:#cfc
| 62 || June 10 || @ Reds || 7–2 || Suter (7–3) || Castillo (2–9) || — || 12,423 || 35–27 || W1
|-style=background:#cfc
| 63 || June 11 || Pirates || 7–4 || Woodruff (5–2) || Holmes (2–1) || Hader (15) || 17,678 || 36–27 || W2
|-style=background:#cfc
| 64 || June 12 || Pirates || 7–4 || Richards (1–0) || Kuhl (0–4) || Hader (16) || 20,126 || 37–27 || W3
|-style=background:#cfc
| 65 || June 13 || Pirates || 5–2 || Suter (8–3) || Bednar (0–1) || Hader (17) || 20,545 || 38–27 || W4
|-style=background:#fbb
| 66 || June 14 || Reds || 2–10 || Gutiérrez (3–1) || Lauer (1–3) || — || 17,127 || 38–28 || L1
|-style=background:#fbb
| 67 || June 15 || Reds || 1–2 (10) || Sims (4–1) || Boxberger (2–2) || Garrett (3) || 16,584 || 38–29 || L2
|-style=background:#fbb
| 68 || June 16 || Reds || 1–2 || Mahle (7–2) || Peralta (6–2) || Sims (7) || 20,088 || 38–30 || L3
|-style=background:#fbb
| 69 || June 17 || @ Rockies || 3–7 || Márquez (5–6) || Woodruff (5–3) || — || 22,756 || 38–31 || L4
|-style=background:#fbb
| 70 || June 18 || @ Rockies || 5–6  || Chacín (1–1) || Williams (2–1) || — || 27,117 || 38–32 || L5
|-style=background:#cfc
| 71 || June 19 || @ Rockies || 6–5 || Richards (2–0) || Kinley (1–1) || Hader (18) || 34,198 || 39–32 || W1
|-style=background:#cfc
| 72 || June 20 || @ Rockies || 7–6 || Williams (3–1) || Bard (3–4) || Boxberger (3) || 34,224 || 40–32 || W2
|-style=background:#fbb
| 73 || June 21 || @ Diamondbacks || 1–5 || Kelly (3–7) || Anderson (2–5) || — || 9,804 || 40–33 || L1
|-style=background:#cfc
| 74 || June 22 || @ Diamondbacks || 5–0 || Peralta (7–2) || Gallen (1–3) || — || 9,358 || 41–33 || W1
|-style=background:#cfc
| 75 || June 23 || @ Diamondbacks || 3–2 || Woodruff (6–3) || Smith (2–3) || Hader (19) || 8,676 || 42–33 || W2
|-style=background:#cfc
| 76 || June 25 || Rockies || 5–4 (11) || Williams (4–1) || Gilbreath (0–1) || — || 31,140 || 43–33 || W3
|-style=background:#cfc
| 77 || June 26 || Rockies || 10–4 || Boxberger (3–2) || Estévez (2–1) || — || 32,573 || 44–33 || W4
|-style=background:#cfc
| 78 || June 27 || Rockies || 5–0 || Lauer (2–3) || Gonzalez (2–5) || — || 25,016 || 45–33 || W5
|-style=background:#cfc
| 79 || June 28 || Cubs || 14–4 || Williams (5–1) || Tepera (0–2) || — || 30,251 || 46–33 || W6
|-style=background:#cfc
| 80 || June 29 || Cubs || 2–1 || Woodruff (7–3) || Davies (5–5) || Hader (20) || 24,423 || 47–33 || W7
|-style=background:#cfc
| 81 || June 30 || Cubs || 15–7 || Richards (3–0) || Brothers (2–1) || — || 32,193 || 48–33 || W8
|-

|-style=background:#cfc
| 82 || July 1 || @ Pirates || 7–2 || Burnes (4–4) || Crowe (1–5) || — || 11,074 || 49–33 || W9
|-style=background:#cfc
| 83 || July 2 || @ Pirates || 7–2 || Houser (5–5) || Brubaker (4–8) || — || 15,421 || 50–33 || W10
|-style=background:#cfc
| 84 || July 3 || @ Pirates || 11–2 || Lauer (3–3) || Ponce (0–2) || — || 17,451 || 51–33 || W11
|-style=background:#fbb
| 85 || July 4 || @ Pirates || 0–2 || Anderson (4–8) || Peralta (7–3) || Rodríguez (11) || 12,527 || 51–34 || L1
|-style=background:#fbb
| 86 || July 5 || @ Mets || 2–4 || Lugo (2–1) || Woodruff (7–4) || Díaz (18) || 15,145 || 51–35 || L2
|-style="background:#bbb 
| — || July 6 || @ Mets || colspan=7| Postponed (Rain, Makeup: July 7)
|-style=background:#fbb
| 87 || July 7  || @ Mets || 3–4 (8) || Díaz (3–2) || Suter (8–4) || — || 20,953 || 51–36 || L3
|-style=background:#cfc
| 88 || July 7  || @ Mets || 5–0 (7) || Cousins (1–0) || Stock (0–2) || — || 13,218 || 52–36 || W1
|-style=background:#cfc
| 89 || July 8 || Reds || 5–3 || Williams (6–1) || Brach (0–1) || Hader (21) || 22,948 || 53–36 || W2
|-style=background:#fbb
| 90 || July 9 || Reds || 0–2 || Miley (7–4) || Lauer (3–4) || Hembree (5) || 24,844 || 53–37 || L1
|-style=background:#fbb
| 91 || July 10 || Reds || 3–4 || Osich (2–0) || Hader (3–1) || Hembree (6) || 32,034 || 53–38 || L2
|-style=background:#fbb
| 92 || July 11 || Reds || 1–3 || Hendrix (5–1) || Hader (3–2) || Osich (1) || 32,135 || 53–39 || L3
|-style=background:#bcf
| ASG || July 13 || AL @ NL || 2–5 || Ohtani (1–0) || Burnes (0–1) || Hendriks (1) || 49,184 || — || ?
|-style=background:#cfc
| 93 || July 16 || @ Reds || 11–6 || Suter (9–4) || Garrett (0–3) || — || 34,844 || 54–39 || W1
|-style=background:#cfc
| 94 || July 17 || @ Reds || 7–4  || Gustave (1–0) || Doolittle (3–1) || — || 37,204 || 55–39 || W2
|-style=background:#cfc
| 95 || July 18 || @ Reds || 8–0 || Burnes (5–4) || Gray (2–5) || — || 29,001 || 56–39 || W3
|-style=background:#fbb
| 96 || July 20 || Royals || 2–5 || Minor (7–8) || Strickland (0–1) || Holland (6) || 20,140 || 56–40 || L1
|-style=background:#fbb
| 97 || July 21 || Royals || 3–6 || Keller (7–9) || Suter (9–5) || Barlow (5) || 30,063 || 56–41 || L2
|-style=background:#cfc
| 98 || July 23 || White Sox || 7–1 || Houser (6–5) || Giolito (8–7) || — || 32,714 || 57–41 || W1
|-style=background:#cfc
| 99 || July 24 || White Sox || 6–1 || Burnes (6–4) || Rodón (8–4) || — || 41,686 || 58–41 || W2
|-style=background:#fbb
| 100 || July 25 || White Sox || 1–3 || Lynn (10–3) || Woodruff (7–5) || Hendriks (24) || 36,887 || 58–42 || L1
|-style=background:#cfc
| 101 || July 27 || @ Pirates || 9–0 || Anderson (3–5) || Oviedo (1–2) || — || 10,618 || 59–42 || W1
|-style=background:#cfc
| 102 || July 28 || @ Pirates || 7–3 || Houser (7–5) || Kranick (1–2) || — || 10,204 || 60–42 || W2
|-style=background:#cfc
| 103 || July 29 || @ Pirates || 12–0 || Peralta (8–3) || Kuhl (3–6) || — || 10,503 || 61–42 || W3
|-style=background:#cfc
| 104 || July 30 || @ Braves || 9–5 || Boxberger (4–2) || Toussaint (1–2) || — || 38,680 || 62–42 || W4
|-style=background:#fbb
| 105 || July 31 || @ Braves || 1–8 || Chavez (2–2) || Woodruff (7–6) || — || 39,088 || 62–43 || L1
|-

|-style=background:#cfc
| 106 || August 1 || @ Braves || 2–1 || Anderson (4–5) || Morton (10–4) || Hader (22) || 33,469 || 63–43 || W1
|-style=background:#cfc
| 107 || August 2 || Pirates || 6–2 || Lauer (4–4) || Wilson (2–4) || Boxberger (4) || 23,563 || 64–43 || W2
|-style=background:#fbb
| 108 || August 3 || Pirates || 5–8  || Bednar (3–1) || Hardy (0–1) || — || 24,902 || 64–44 || L1
|-style=background:#cfc
| 109 || August 4 || Pirates || 4–2 || Suter (10–5) || Keller (0–1) || Williams (1)  || 28,003 || 65–44 || W1
|-style=background:#cfc
| 110 || August 6 || Giants || 2–1 (10) || Suter (11–5) || García (3–3) || — || 33,250 || 66–44 || W2
|-style=background:#fbb
| 111 || August 7 || Giants || 6–9 (11) || García (4–3) || Romano (0–1) || — || 34,155 || 66–45 || L1
|-style=background:#fbb
| 112 || August 8 || Giants || 4–5 || Watson (4–3) || Boxberger (4–3) || Littell (1) || 38,597 || 66–46 || L2
|-style=background:#bbb 
| — || August 9 || @ Cubs || colspan=7 | Postponed (rain; makeup August 10)
|-style=background:#cfc
| 113 || August 10 (1) || @ Cubs || 4–2 (7) || Peralta (9–3) || Steele (2–1) || Williams (2) || 29,031 || 67–46 || W1
|-style=background:#cfc
| 114 || August 10 (2) || @ Cubs || 6–3 (7) || Sánchez (1–0) || Winkler (1–3) || — || 28,674 || 68–46 || W2
|-style=background:#cfc
| 115 || August 11 || @ Cubs || 10–0 || Burnes (7–4) || Arrieta (5–11) || — || 29,619 || 69–46 || W3
|-style=background:#cfc
| 116 || August 12 || @ Cubs || 17–4 || Strickland (1–1) || Hendricks (13–5) || — || 32,502 || 70–46 || W4
|-style=background:#bbb
| — || August 13 || @ Pirates || colspan=7 | Postponed (rain; makeup August 14)
|-style=background:#fbb
| 117 || August 14 (1) || @ Pirates || 4–14 (7) || Shreve (1–0) || Anderson (4–6) || — || 16,991 || 70–47 || L1
|-style=background:#cfc
| 118 || August 14 (2) || @ Pirates || 6–0 (7) || Boxberger (5–3) || Keller (3–10) || — || 24,081 || 71–47 || W1
|-style=background:#cfc
| 119 || August 15 || @ Pirates || 2–1 || Suter (12–5) || Peters (0–1) || Hader (23) || 12,001 || 72–47 || W2
|-style=background:#cfc
| 120 || August 17 || @ Cardinals || 2–0 || Burnes (8–4) || Wainwright (11–7) || Hader (24) || 28,058 || 73–47 || W3
|-style=background:#cfc
| 121 || August 18 || @ Cardinals || 6–4 (10) || Hader (4–2) || Reyes (5–6) || Williams (3) || 25,938 || 74–47 || W4
|-style=background:#fbb
| 122 || August 19 || @ Cardinals || 4–8 || Fernández (1–0) || Woodruff (7–7) || — || 27,545 || 74–48 || L1
|-style=background:#fbb
| 123 || August 20 || Nationals || 1–4 || Corbin (7–12) || Anderson (4–7) || Finnegan (5) || 27,998 || 74–49 || L2
|-style=background:#cfc
| 124 || August 21 || Nationals || 9–6 || Williams (7–1) || Guerra (0–1) || Hader (25) || 36,938 || 75–49 || W1
|-style=background:#cfc
| 125 || August 22 || Nationals || 7–3 || Strickland (2–1) || Nolin (0–2) || Hader (26) || 33,507 || 76–49 || W2
|-style=background:#cfc
| 126 || August 24 || Reds || 7–4 || Strickland (3–1) || Lorenzen (0–1) || Hader (27) || 24,819 || 77–49 || W3
|-style=background:#cfc
| 127 || August 25 || Reds || 4–1 || Woodruff (8–7) || Castillo (7–13) || — || 24,715 || 78–49 || W4
|-style=background:#fbb
| 128 || August 26 || Reds || 1–5 || Gray (6–6) || Anderson (4–8) || — || 28,656 || 78–50 || L1
|-style=background:#fbb
| 129 || August 27 || @ Twins || 0–2 || Albers (1–0) || Lauer (4–5) || Colomé (8) || 20,280 || 78–51 || L2
|-style=background:#fbb
| 130 || August 28 || @ Twins || 4–6 || Thielbar (6–0) || Houser (7–6) || Colomé (9) || 29,342 || 78–52 || L3
|-style=background:#cfc
| 131 || August 29 || @ Twins || 6–2 || Ashby (1–0) || Jax (3–3) || — || 26,186 || 79–52 || W1
|-style=background:#cfc
| 132 || August 30 || @ Giants || 3–1 || Burnes (9–4) || Álvarez (4–2) || Hader (28) || 23,154 || 80–52 || W2
|-style=background:#cfc
| 133 || August 31 || @ Giants || 6–2 || Woodruff (9–7) || Cueto (7–7) || — || 20,897 || 81–52 || W3
|-

|-style=background:#cfc
| 134 || September 1 || @ Giants || 5–2 || Norris (2–3) || Leone (3–3) || Hader (29) || 21,189 || 82–52 || W4
|-style=background:#fbb
| 135 || September 2 || @ Giants || 1–5 || Rogers (5–1) || Williams (7–2) || — || 21,023 || 82–53 || L1
|-style=background:#fbb
| 136 || September 3 || Cardinals || 4–15 || Wainwright (14–7) || Peralta (9–4) || — || 23,987 || 82–54 || L2
|-style=background:#cfc
| 137 || September 4 || Cardinals || 4–0 || Houser (8–6) || Kim (6–7) || — || 33,439 || 83–54 || W1
|-style=background:#cfc
| 138 || September 5 || Cardinals || 6–5 || Sánchez (2–0) || Reyes (5–8) || — || 33,845 || 84–54 || W2
|-style=background:#fbb
| 139 || September 6 || Phillies || 0–12 || Wheeler (12–9) || Woodruff (9–8) || — || 30,192 || 84–55 || L1
|-style=background:#cfc
| 140 || September 7 || Phillies || 10–0 || Lauer (5–5) || Nola (7–8) || — || 22,955 || 85–55 || W1
|-style=background:#cfc
| 141 || September 8 || Phillies || 4–3 || Ashby (2–0) || Brogdon (5–4) || Hader (30) || 20,654 || 86–55 || W2
|-style=background:#cfc
| 142 || September 10 || @ Indians || 10–3 || Houser (9–6) || Morgan (2–7) || — || 17,667 || 87–55 || W3
|-style=background:#cfc
| 143 || September 11 || @ Indians || 3–0 || Burnes (10–4) || Plesac (10–5) || Hader (31) || 20,100 || 88–55 || W4
|-style=background:#cfc
| 144 || September 12 || @ Indians || 11–1 || Lauer (6–5) || Civale (10–4) || Ashby (1) || 16,332 || 89–55 || W5
|-style=background:#fbb
| 145 || September 14 || @ Tigers || 0–1  || Garcia (2–1) || Strickland (3–2) || — || 12,433 || 89–56 || L1
|-style=background:#fbb
| 146 || September 15 || @ Tigers || 1–4 || Manning (4–6) || Woodruff (9–9) || Fulmer (9) || 11,321 || 89–57 || L2
|-style=background:#cfc
| 147 || September 17 || Cubs || 8–5 || Ashby (3–0) || Wick (0–1) || Hader (32) || 28,483 || 90–57 || W1
|-style=background:#cfc
| 148 || September 18 || Cubs || 6–4 || Williams (8–2) || Effross (2–1) || Hader (33) || 33,625 || 91–57 || W2
|-style=background:#fbb
| 149 || September 19 || Cubs || 4–6 || Morgan (1–0) || Boxberger (5–4) || Rucker (1) || 34,213 || 91–58 || L1
|-style=background:#fbb
| 150 || September 20 || Cardinals || 2–5 || Lester (7–6) || Peralta (9–5) || García (1) || 28,291 || 91–59 || L2
|-style=background:#fbb
| 151 || September 21 || Cardinals || 1–2 || Woodford (3–3) || Woodruff (9–10) || Gallegos (11) || 30,475 || 91–60 || L3
|-style=background:#fbb
| 152 || September 22 || Cardinals || 2–10 || Mikolas (2–2) || Anderson (4–9) || — || 29,635 || 91–61 || L4
|-style=background:#fbb
| 153 || September 23 || Cardinals || 5–8 || McFarland (4–1) || Ashby (3–1) || Gallegos (12) || 30,804 || 91–62 || L5
|-style=background:#cfc
| 154 || September 24 || Mets || 5–1 || Lauer (7–5) || Megill (3–6) || — || 27,452 || 92–62 || W1
|-style=background:#cfc
| 155 || September 25 || Mets || 2–1 || Burnes (11–4) || Hill (6–8) || Hader (34) || 35,388 || 93–62 || W2
|-style=background:#cfc
| 156 || September 26 || Mets || 8–4 || Peralta (10–5) || Carrasco (1–4) || — || 43,430 || 94–62 || W3
|-style=background:#fbb
| 157 || September 28 || @ Cardinals || 2–6 || Wainwright (17–7) || Gustave (1–1) || — || 35,726 || 94–63 || L1
|-style=background:#cfc
| 158 || September 29 || @ Cardinals || 4–0 || Houser (10–6) || Mikolas (2–3) || — || 35,283 || 95–63 || W1
|-style=background:#fbb
| 159 || September 30 || @ Cardinals || 3–4 || Happ (10–8) || Sánchez (2–1) || García (2) || 29,161 || 95–64 || L1
|-style=background:#fbb
| 160 || October 1 || @ Dodgers || 6–8 || Treinen (6–5) || Gustave (1–2) || Jansen (38) || 51,388 || 95–65 || L2
|-style=background:#fbb
| 161 || October 2 || @ Dodgers || 3–8 || Urías (20–3) || Burnes (11–5) || — || 49,705 || 95–66 || L3
|-style=background:#fbb
| 162 || October 3 || @ Dodgers || 3–10 || Buehler (16–4) || Ashby (3–2) || Jackson (1) || 43,170 || 95–67 || L4
|-

|- style="text-align:center;"
| Legend:       = Win       = Loss       = PostponementBold = Brewers team member

Postseason

|- style="background:#cfc
| 1 || October 8 || Braves || 2–1 || Houser (1–0) || Morton (0–1) || Hader (1) || 40,852 || 1–0 || W1
|- style="background:#fbb
| 2 || October 9 || Braves || 0–3 || Fried (1–0) || Woodruff (0–1) || Smith (1) || 43,812 || 1–1 || L1
|- style="background:#fbb
| 3 || October 11 || @ Braves || 0–3 || Anderson (1–0) || Houser (1–1) || Smith (2) || 41,479 || 1–2 || L2
|- style="background:#fbb
| 4 || October 12 || @ Braves || 4–5 || Matzek (1–0) || Hader (0–1) || Smith (3) || 40,195 || 1–3 || L3
|-

Postseason rosters

| style="text-align:left" |
Pitchers: 26 Aaron Ashby 31 Jandel Gustave 37 Adrian Houser 39 Corbin Burnes 43 Hunter Strickland 45 Brad Boxberger 51 Freddy Peralta 52 Eric Lauer 53 Brandon Woodruff 54 Jake Cousins 71 Josh Hader
Catchers: 9 Manny Piña 10 Omar Narváez 12 Luke Maile 
Infielders: 2 Luis Urías 5 Eduardo Escobar 11 Rowdy Tellez 14 Jace Peterson 16 Kolten Wong 20 Daniel Vogelbach 27 Willy Adames 
Outfielders: 6 Lorenzo Cain 15 Tyrone Taylor 22 Christian Yelich 24 Avisaíl García 41 Jackie Bradley Jr. 
|- valign="top"

Farm system

The Brewers' farm system consisted of eight minor league affiliates in 2021.

References

External links
2021 Milwaukee Brewers season at Baseball Reference
Milwaukee Brewers season Official Site 

Milwaukee Brewers seasons
Milwaukee Brewers
Milwaukee Brewers
National League Central champion seasons